Rangsima Rodrasamee (born August 13, 1962) is a Thai politician who represented Samut Songkhram (Democrat Party) in the House of Representatives.

Personal life and education 
She graduated from the Faculty of Nursing, Prince of Songkla University, Southern Thailand. She has been a nurse at various hospitals for more than 20 years.

She served as a member of parliament between 2001 and 2013 (four terms until 2013). In 2011 she took on the alias "Council Star" from journalists after prominent debates in the House of Representatives.

Rodrasamee is single. On March 23, 2017, she crashed her white Mercedes-Benz C-Class C 200 into a road barrier in Samut Songkhram and was immediately taken to the hospital.

References

External links
Official Facebook 

Rangsima Rodrasamee
Rangsima Rodrasamee
Rangsima Rodrasamee
Rangsima Rodrasamee
1962 births
Living people
Rangsima Rodrasamee